The Emblem of Telangana is the state emblem of Telangana in South India. The arms has the Kakatiya Kala Thoranam in the middle, and the Charminar inside it and bordered in green.

Design
The emblem is a circular seal consisting of the Kakatiya Kala Thoranam and Charminar with the Sarnath Lion Capital above. It has "Government of Telangana" in English,  "Telangana Sarkar" in Urdu and "Telangana Prabhutvamu" in Telugu. Satyameva Jayate is written in Sanskrit.

History
The emblem was designed by painter, Laxman Aelay. It was adopted on 2 June 2014 after the newly formed government headed by K. Chandrashekar Rao adopted it. It was the first file to be signed by him after swearing in. Initially, Charminar was not included, but after the advice of Asaduddin Owaisi, (Hyderabad MP), it was added.

		 		Initially the national motto was written below the emblem. Naresh Kadyan, Abhishek Kadyan, and Sukanya Kadyan complained to the government about the alleged insult of the Emblem without the motto. The Sarnath Lion Capital, when used in heraldry, is required to have the words Satyameva Jayate underneath it, as per the State Emblem of India (Prohibition of Improver Use) Act, 2005, which the new logo violated when it was first released. The emblem was corrected with an amendment approved by the Government of Telangana on 25 June 2014 made by Laxman Aelay, by moving the Satyameva Jayate below the Sarnath Lion Capital, complying with the national norm.

Historic emblems

Government banner
The Government of Telangana can be represented by a banner displaying the emblem of the state on a white field.

See also
 National Emblem of India
 List of Indian state emblems

References

Government of Telangana
Telangana
Telangana
Telangana
Telangana
Telangana